San Antón is a barrio in the municipality of Carolina, Puerto Rico. Its population in 2010 was 13,578.

History
Puerto Rico was ceded by Spain in the aftermath of the Spanish–American War under the terms of the Treaty of Paris of 1898 and became an unincorporated territory of the United States. In 1899, the United States Department of War conducted a census of Puerto Rico finding that the population of San Antonio barrio (as it was called then) was 615.

San Antón saw a 21.7% increase in population from 1990 to 2000 and a 29.7% increase from 2000 to 2010.

Gallery

See also

 List of communities in Puerto Rico

References

External links 

 

Barrios of Carolina, Puerto Rico